Roderick Fitz-Randolph (born January 21, 1959) is an American former sports shooter. He competed in the men's 10 metre air rifle event at the 1988 Summer Olympics.

References

External links
 

1959 births
Living people
American male sport shooters
Olympic shooters of the United States
Shooters at the 1988 Summer Olympics
Sportspeople from Starkville, Mississippi
Pan American Games medalists in shooting
Pan American Games gold medalists for the United States
Pan American Games silver medalists for the United States
Shooters at the 1979 Pan American Games
Shooters at the 1983 Pan American Games
20th-century American people
21st-century American people